Eric Hall (1938–2020)  was a British football agent.

Eric Hall may also refer to:

Eric Hall (athlete) (born 1932), Olympic racewalker
Ross Hall (politician) (1925–1999), Canadian politician
Eric G. Hall (1922–1998), Pakistani general
Eric Ogilvie Hall, New Zealand materials scientist

See also
Rick Hall

Hall, Eric